Pelargonium pulchellum, known as the Nonesuch pelargonium, is a member of the family Geraniaceae found in the Northern Cape province of South Africa.

References

pulchellum